Robert Dodds or variation may refer to:
Robert Dodds (aviator) (1893–1980), Canadian aviator
Robert H. Dodds Jr., American civil engineer
Robert R. Dodds (1924–1998), American politician from Iowa
Bobby Dodds (1923–after 1948), English footballer
Robert Dodds, shortlisted for the Hampshire Book Awards in 2003